Stamping Mill is an American experimental rock band, founded in 2009 in Northern California.  The sole member of the band, who goes by the pseudonym of Joseph, composes songs using a computer program to generate musical notes randomly.  The structure and collections of tones within each song are predetermined, while the sequence of notes is selected randomly and then recorded using guitars or xylophones or other instruments.  This style of music, in which some element of the composition is left to chance, is known as aleatoric music.  Aleatoric music is primarily associated with classical composers like John Cage and Witold Lutosławski and has only occasionally been used in the rock genre. 

Stamping Mill's music is accompanied by bass, drums, and aggravated vocals that add to the disorderly arrangement.  Their song structures generally exclude choruses and bridges and often include atonal sections.  Stamping Mill's sound has been described as an abrasive, discordant, jarring, cacophonous blend of indie rock, metal, & punk.

Stamping Mill has released 3 EPs since 2011:

Sublevel Drift (2011)

Block Caving (2013)

Agitation Systems (2015)

References

American experimental musicians